Joshua L. Steiner is a private investor and a senior adviser at Bloomberg LP., where he was previously Head of Industry Verticals. During his tenure at Bloomberg, Steiner oversaw the company's non-financial information businesses, venture capital fund, and corporate development and strategy teams. He also led company-wide initiatives in data privacy, emerging markets growth, and market liberalization.

In 2008, during President Obama's transition into office, Joshua Steiner served as an adviser to the Obama administration regarding economy policy.

Previously he was a Managing Director at Lazard Frères & Co. and former Chief of Staff of the U.S. Treasury Department in the Clinton Administration.

Department of Treasury 
Previously Steiner was Chief of Staff of the U.S. Treasury Department in the Clinton Administration, where he was responsible for managing the Secretary of Treasury's staff and served as his advisor on domestic and international policy as well as management and communications issues. Steiner came into national news as a result of the Whitewater investigations where he testified before Congress on the contacts between the Treasury and the Clinton White House. He testified before the Senate Banking Committee on August 2, 1994.

Other affiliations 
He is a trustee of Yale University and serves on the board of the International Rescue Committee  and the Agora Institute at Johns Hopkins University. He is an honorary trustee of the New York Public Library, where he was previously the vice chair of the board.

References

External links

 
Living people
American business executives
United States Department of the Treasury officials
Year of birth missing (living people)
Phillips Academy alumni